Sisuarissut Island is an island of Greenland. It is located in Tasiusaq Bay in the Upernavik Archipelago.

Islands of the Upernavik Archipelago